Temilola Balogun known as TaymiB and Temi Balogun Akinmuda is a Nigerian media personality and creator of the TV series Skinny Girl in Transit.

Life
She was educated at Queen's College in Lagos and then studied media at Nottingham Trent University. She was once a tee-shirt designer who sang in a duo called "Soyinka's Afro" with her brother aka Ajebutter 22 in 2009.

Balogun became a host at Cool FM Nigeria which is a pop and rock station for an adult audience broadcasting from Lagos. She is the creator of the TV series Skinny Girl in Transit which in 2020 was in its sixth series. She leads BOX TV who also launched a series titled "Things Men Say", based on the outrageous things she has heard. The show launched in 2017.

In 2019 Balogun and N6 hosted a live interview with American rapper Cardi B which was considered a scoop.
Cardi B was on her first tour of Africa, performing in both Nigeria and Ghana.

Private life
She is married to Timi Akinmuda and they have two children.

References

Living people
Nigerian television producers
Women television producers
Year of birth missing (living people)
Queen's College, Lagos alumni
Nottingham Trent University
Nigerian screenwriters
Alumni of Nottingham Trent University
Nigerian media personalities
Yoruba people
Nigerian radio presenters
Nigerian women radio presenters